Andreja Slokar (born 15 October 1997) is a Slovenian World Cup alpine ski racer and specializes in the technical events of slalom and giant slalom. At the World Championships in 2021, she was fifth in the slalom.

On 13 November 2021, Slokar attained her first World Cup podium with a victory in a parallel giant slalom at Lech/Zürs, Austria.

World Cup results

Season standings

Race podiums
 2 wins – (1 PG, 1 SL)
 2 podiums – (1 PG, 1 SL); 7 top tens

World Championship results

Olympic results

References

External links

1997 births
Living people
Slovenian female alpine skiers
Alpine skiers of Gruppo Sportivo Esercito
People from Ajdovščina
Alpine skiers at the 2022 Winter Olympics
Olympic alpine skiers of Slovenia